The Gibraltar men's national basketball team is the representative for the British overseas territory of Gibraltar in international basketball. The team is selected by the Gibraltar Amateur Basketball Association (GABBA) which is a member of FIBA Europe since 1985. The team competes at the European Championship for Small Countries, and in the Island Games.

Competitive record

Team

Current roster
Roster for the 2018 FIBA European Championship for Small Countries.

Kit

Manufacturer
2016: Spalding

Sponsor
2016: odobo

See also

Sport in Gibraltar
Gibraltar women's national basketball team
Gibraltar men's national under-18 basketball team
Gibraltar men's national under-16 basketball team

References

External links
Official website 
Gibraltar at Facebook.com  
Gibraltar at FIBA site
Gibraltar National Team - Men at Eurobasket.com

Basketball
Men's national basketball teams
1985 establishments in Gibraltar
Basketball in Gibraltar
Basketball teams in Gibraltar